More Jack than God is the thirteenth studio album by Scottish musician Jack Bruce, released in August 2003. It was the second of two Bruce albums to be co-produced by Kip Hanrahan.

Track listing
 "So They Invented Race" (Bruce, Kip Hanrahan) – 6:17
 "Follow the Fire" (Pete Brown, Bruce) – 4:22
 "Kelly's Blues" (Brown, Bruce) – 5:29
 "We're Going Wrong" (Bruce) – 5:14
 "Bizniz" (Brown, Bruce) – 4:53
 "Progress" (Brown, Bruce) – 2:35
 "I Feel Free" (Brown, Bruce) – 3:44
 "Ricin (Daylight Gathering)" (Bruce, Hanrahan) – 3:45
 "The Night That Once Was Mine" (Brown, Bruce) – 3:55
 "Milonga Too" (Bruce, Hanrahan) – 3:24
 "Cold Island (For Cozy Powell)" (Brown, Bruce) – 4:57
 "Uh, Oh!" (Bruce, Hanrahan) – 4:36
 "Politician" (Brown, Bruce) – 5:53
 "Lost in the City" (Jam Mix) (Bruce, Hanrahan) – 7:17

Personnel
Musicians

 Jack Bruce – vocals, bass, bass pedals, drums, acoustic guitar, piano, synthesizer, Hammond organ
 Robby Ameen – drums
 Malcolm Bruce – guitar, piano
 Richie Flores – conga, vocals
 Horacio "El Negro" Hernández – drums, vocals
 Vernon Reid – electric guitar
 Godfrey Townsend – acoustic guitar
 Bernie Worrell – Hammond organ, vocals

 Production

 Jack Bruce – composer, arranger, producer
 Kip Hanrahan – composer, producer
 Pete Brown – lyricist
 Jeff Hoffman – assistant
 Dick Kondas – engineer
 Jon Fausty – engineer, mixing
 Greg Calbi – mastering
 Bill Smith  – art direction
 Michele Turriani – photography
 Margrit Seyffer – executive producer

References

2003 albums
Jack Bruce albums
Sanctuary Records albums